Mamianqun, also known as , sometimes simply referred as 'apron', a generic term in English to refer to any Chinese-style skirt, or 'paired apron' in English although they are not aprons as defined in the dictionary, is a type of , a traditional Chinese skirt worn by the Han Chinese women as lower garment item in  and is one of the main representatives of ancient Chinese-style skirts. It originated in the Song and Liao dynasties and became popular due to its functionality and its aesthetics style. It continued to be worn in the Yuan, Ming, and Qing dynasties where it was a typical style of skirt for women and was favoured for its unique aesthetic style and functionality. Following the fall of the Qing dynasty, the  continued to be worn in the Republic of China, and only disappeared in the 1920s and 1930s  following the increased popularity of the cheongsam. In the 21st century, the  regained popularity with the emergence of the Hanfu movement. The  has experienced various fashion changes throughout history.

Etymology 
The term  is composed of three Chinese characters: 《》, which literally means 'horse'; 《》, which literally means "face"; and 《》, which literally means "skirt".

The name Paired apron has sometimes been used in English literature to refer to the  due to its construction of using two overlapping panels of fabric tied to a single waistband forming a single wrap skirt which is tied around the waist, like an apron. The term Paired apron was coined by John Vollmer in the second half of the 20th century and can be found as early as 1980s.

Cultural significance and functionality 

The  represents an important aesthetic and cultural concept in the life history of Chinese women as it is representative of the Zen aesthetic concept of "despising structure, emphasizing decoration, implicitly natural, and releasing the body"; this concept differs from the Western concept of emphasizing the structure and draping of the human body. These skirts were only worn by Chinese women and were not worn by the Manchu women of the ruling class during the Qing dynasty.

Due to the unique overlapping construction of the skirt, there were openings at the front and back of the skirt which facilitated horse-riding; this characteristic would also allow for greater freedom of movement when walking, which was necessary for Chinese women who had bound feet who were walking with small and shuffling steps; the need for this kind of functional skirt when walking did not arise until the Song dynasty when foot binding became popular. The pleats of pleats in Chinese skirts and its association to foot biding practice also appeared in European literature, such as in Intimate China: The Chinese as I Have Seen Them of 1899 by Mrs. Archibald Little:

Moreover, the fullness of the skirt created by the side panels provided enough space to accommodate the traditional loose garments of Chinese women.

Construction and design 
Similar descriptions were found in the Voyage en Chine of 1847.

Main characteristics 

The  is composed of two overlapping panel of fabrics which wrapped around the lower body. Each of these two panels were identical and formed half of the skirt, which were then sewn together a single waistband creating the overlapping front. When worn, only two out of the four flat panels are visible on the wearer's body; the visible panels are seen located at the front and back of the skirt; The  were typically tied with ties which extended beyond the skirt's width at the waistband.

Skirt length 
However, variations in skirt length may have existed during the Qing dynasty as European accounts prior to the 1850s have sometimes described it as being above the ankle level and allowed the exposure of the trousers in 1846s while others have described it as being long enough to cover the feet in 1849s.

Pleats, gores, and trims 
The historical  is typically decorated with pleated side panels, gores, which can also vary in styles and types. The use pleats, gores, and sometimes godet on the left side of the skirt allowed greater ease of movements when walking, allowing Chinese women to swing gracefully as they walked. The trims which decorated  of the Qing dynasty did not only impacted the overall appearance of the skirt, but also influenced the way it would move as the wearer takes walk. For example, depending on how the each trims were sewed to the edge of the pleats, the pleats may move independently from each other or create "ripple effects".

Types of pleats 

Types of pleats used in the historical : narrow pleats in honeycomb pattern or in fish-scale pattern, knife pleats; and box pleat.

The pleats could also be a combination of knife pleats which radiate outwards to the left and right of a central box pleat located at the middle region of side hips. These types of pleats used in the  contrasted from the pleats used in the wide skirt of Western ladies as described by Samuel Wells William in 1849:

History: evolution and style variations 

Wrap-around skirt artifacts worn by Chinese women, known under the generic term , appeared as early as the Zhou and Han dynasties. Pleated skirts also appeared early on in China; according to the popular story, in the Han dynasty, pleated skirts became in vogue as women imitated the ripped skirt of Zhao Feiyan (? – 1 BC), a legendary dancer who later became an empress, who had her skirt ripped when she was saved from a fall by Feng Wufang. The term Mamianqun first appeared in the "History of the Ming Palace": "The drag and drop, the rear placket is continuous, and the two sides have swings, the front placket is two sections, and the bottom has horse face pleats, which rise to both sides. "But the history of the Mamianqun can be traced back to the Song Dynasty, because the skirt of the Song Dynasty already had the Mamian‘s shape of the Mamianqun. However, the prototypes of the  originated in the Song (960 –1279 AD) and Liao dynasties (916 – 1125 AD). The  experienced several changes of style, colours, fabric materials, and patterns over the dynasties. The tailoring of the side panels, construction, and decoration of the skirt reflect changes in social and economic conditions during the time in which the skirts were made.

Song and Liao dynasties 
During the Song dynasty, the  first appeared and apparently could have absorbed some influences from the clothing worn by China's nomadic neighbours. Those two forms of wrapped skirts were found in the Song dynasty tomb of Huang Sheng in Fuzhou, Fujian Province.

The first  prototype skirt found in the Tomb of Huang Sheng was made of plain silk with a reinforcing layer at the centre of the skirt and patterned borders on one side, on the hem, and also on one side of the central panel. It was made of 2 pieces of fabric which overlapped at the central region at the front and the back; the openings of the skirt allowed horseback riding. It also had a wide waistband and was closed with ties; the waistband was made from fabric which was different from the one used in the skirt. According to the 《》of the Song dynasty:

Horse riding and donkey riding was common in the Song dynasty as means of transportation; according to Wen Yanbo of the Northern Song dynasty, "upper-class families in town and countryside [...] all raised horses and rode them instead of walking" while in the History Narrated at Ease, volume 3, it is also recorded that "donkeys were for rent in the capital, and thus people often meet each other in the street on donkeys". Donkey riding was not uncommon for Chinese women in this period. Due to the novelty design of these skirts compared to the contemporary ordinary skirts of this period, they were considered as "".

The second prototype also comes from the Tomb of Huang Sheng; it was made of thin silk printed all over with large dots; this skirt was densely pleated except for the two sections at both edges of the skirt and the waistband was made of the same fabric as the skirt. The pleats like the present-day  were also found on the two sides of the skirt.

Yuan dynasty 
The waistband was made from fabric which was different from the one used in the skirt.

Ming dynasty 

The waistband was made from fabric which was different from the one used in the skirt. Some women in the Ming dynasty also preferred light colours or white skirts as their favourite colours; this characteristic would later be transferred in the  used on stage in Peking opera. It could also be decorated with a single or double , horizontal pattern, at the knee-level or at the hem of the skirt.

Qing dynasty 

In the Qing dynasty, Han Chinese women were allowed continue the dressing customs of the Ming dynasty and were not forced to adopt the hairstyle and dress of the Manchu rulers under the  policy. Therefore, Han Chinese women in the Qing dynasty continued to preserve  features in their dress and styles. The style, however, progressively changed and the  became more luxurious. The panels of fabric were decorated with embroideries; however, they were typically only embroidered to where the Chinese jackets would meet the skirt. Compared to the skirts worn in the Ming dynasty, the skirts worn in the Qing dynasty also had a more structured appearance.

The tailoring of the  did not show significant changes except for the side panels which started to show some variations in terms of width and number of gores and the pleats techniques.

The wide waistband was without decoration; it was also made of different materials than the main skirt. It was typically made of cheaper fabric than the rest skirt as it was hidden by the upper garments. The main material used in the making of the skirt was typically silk while the choice of fabric for the waistband was usually cotton or hemp; the use of such cheaper fabric over silken fabric was also functional as it prevented the skirt from slipping from slipping down its wearer's body. The  were also held by loops and buttons which were found inside the waistband. Ties could also be used instead of loops and buttons. Several historical  in its variant styles are stored in museums in and outside of China.

The  was one of the most popular form of  style variant in the Qing dynasty; It appeared at least since the 17th century where it was recorded by Li Yu:

The  was a skirt made of 12 gores, in which each gore consists of a different coloured fabric. It was sometimes decorated with ribbons and small bells.

The  appeared in the Qing dynasty during the Qianlong (r. 1735–96) period no later than 1750. According to author, Shaorong Yang, embroidered  with gold threads and made of damask was worn at the end of the Ming dynasty and at the beginning of the Qing dynasty. It became the most popular style during the Kangxi (r. 1661–1722) and Qianlong period. This style continued even in the Republic of China period.

The  was characterized by long and narrow strips of fabric with sharp bottom ends which could be sewn to the waistband of the skirt. The strips of fabric could be made of silk and satin and embroidered with different patterns. The edges of these fabric strips could also be decorated with gold threads or lace, which would make the skirt appear very luxurious. It was sometimes decorated with ribbons and small bells.

It was especially popular in Beijing in 1860s during the Tongzhi era. The  continues to be worn by actors in Peking opera.

The  has two overlapping flat panels and side pleats; its main characteristic is the use of hundreds of tiny pleats which are then secured with an overlay of horizontal stitches in a wave pattern dividing these pleats into sections; the overlapping of these pleats would then give the impression of fish scales patterns. The impression of fish scale-like is where the name skirt gained its name.

The pleats can also be secured to the skirt through the use of hand-made basting stitches on the inside in an alternating pattern; this would then create a honeycomb effect; this form of pleat effect were also referred as fish-scale pleating.

Traditional wedding skirt and official attire for women 

The  continued to be worn by Chinese brides who were allowed to follow the Ming dynasty clothing customs; there wedding attire were in the style of the Ming dynasty's women court attire. They were also used on festive occasions, such as family sacrificial rites and birthdays.

The  might have been worn by women who came from less wealthy families as a wedding skirt on their wedding day.

The  formed part of the traditional Chinese wedding dress attire. This skirt would be first worn on the wedding day of the bride; and following the wedding, she would have to wear it for any formal occasions.

Republic of China 

However, the style also changed, and the  eventually became unadorned and became shorter in length.

21st century 

In the 21st century, the Ming-style  became a popular form of skirt for  enthusiasts.

Modified, modern style 

Ever since the beginning of the Hanfu movement around the year 2003, more modified, modern-style variations of the  based on the Ming dynasty design, such as shorter  (e.g. above the knee, mid-calf, and ankle length),  with pockets, have been developed over the past years by Chinese Hanfu designers and Hanfu enthusiasts. 

Influences and derivatives

In Chinese opera 

Styles of pleats used in the  show the combination of a central box pleat with knife pleats radiating outwards at the right and left side of the central box pleats; the pleats are not found on the grain-line, allowing the creating of a slight flared skirt. The size of the pleats, as well as its depth, reflect the different roles types of the actors and are used as distinguishing indicators. If tighter pleats were used, it was an indication of a person with a high status as tighter pleats requires more fabric.

It also inherited characteristics of the Ming dynasty  through its usage of light colours or white skirts, which were the preferred colours in the Ming dynasty.

The  is a two-pieces garment set of attire which was designed to look like a traditional Chinese wedding dress; it was developed in modern China and became popular in 2001 when it was popularized by when Zhou Xun, the actress who played the role of Xiu He, in the Chinese television drama 《》(), thus gaining its contemporary name from name of the television drama character.

The  is a modern recreation version of the Qing dynasty wedding  which was worn by the Han Chinese women, composed of a lower and an upper garment. This wedding skirt is also called .

The  used in the  can either be an A-line, pleated skirt or a pleated circle skirt.

Apparition and media

20st century 

Princess Diana's  

A red, mid-calf Qing dynasty -style  with chrysanthemum embroideries was worn by Princess Diana on the 23rd February 1981 prior to their official engagement announcement when she posed with Prince Charles at Clarence House. The use of auspicious red colour was in line with Chinese wedding tradition; however, the skirt was not considered fully auspicious according to Chinese beliefs and traditions as it lacked the presence of a white belt and instead a red one was used. A  with a white coloured belt was usually worn by Chinese brides to symbolize "to grow old together", following the Chinese idiom  which literally means , which Princess Diana's skirt lacked of.

21st century 
Following the Hanfu movement, the  re-appeared in several fashion magazines, including the Women's Wear Daily published on the 25th November 2020, in Vogue published on the 8th March 2021, in the Harper's Bazaar on the16th July 2021,

The  also appeared in the animated film Turning Red (2022) by Domee Shi.

Dior controversy 2022 
In 2022, French luxury fashion house Dior fell under heavy public criticism in China after the release of a new black flared, pleated midi-skirt for its Fall 2022 collection which was officially branded as its "hallmark silhouette". This new skirt appeared earlier in an April 2022 runaway in Seoul, and according to the post-show notes of Maria Grazia Chiuri, Italian fashion designer and Dior's art director, the design of Fall 2022 collection was inspired by school uniforms and aimed to pay homage to women who contributed to the success of Christian Dior, which included his own sister Catherine Dior. It was a wrap-around skirt, which was made of two panels of fabric which was sewn to the waistband of the skirt; it featured four flat panels with no pleats (one at each side of each panel of fabric) and pleats; it was constructed in an overlapping fashion such that there was two overlapping flat surface at the back and front and side pleats when worn. On its official website page, this skirt was described as "a hallmark Dior silhouette, the mid-length skirt is updated with a new elegant and modern variation [...]". On its official website page, this skirt was described as "a hallmark Dior silhouette, the mid-length skirt is updated with a new elegant and modern variation [...]" in English.

In July 2022, Chinese netizens and Hanfu enthusiasts took notice of the skirt and observed that the new Dior skirt had the same construction of the historical  of the Ming dynasty with only its length as its main difference from its orthodox version being a midi-skirt. However, the 21st century modern-style  based on the Ming dynasty design can also be found in mid-calf length. Dior was thus accused of plagiarism as the new skirt was deemed to be "a copycat of a traditional Chinese garment" and of cultural appropriation by Chinese netizens and official media outlets, such as the Global Times and the People's Daily, for not acknowledge the (possible) Chinese origins of the new Dior skirt. According to the Journal du Luxe, a French news media, the adoption of the  cut and construction design by Dior was not the main issue of the debate and critics but rather on the absence of transparency surrounding the origins of the inspirations behind the skirt design. Some Chinese netizens also criticized Dior on Weibo with comments, such as "Was Dior inspired by Taobao?" while another Instagram user commented on the official Dior account:Under these accusations, Dior did not immediately respond to a request for comment and decided to stop this sale in the Mainland China's website to avoid controversy. On July 23, about 50 Chinese overseas students in Paris made a protest in front of a Dior flagship store at Champs-Élysée, they used the slogan "Dior, Stop Cultural appropriation" and "This is a traditional Chinese dress" written with a mixture of French and English, and call for other overseas students from the United Kingdom and the United States for relay, the Communist Youth League of China also expressed support for this protest. Similar protests are expected to take place worldwide, such as in New York, United States, and London, United Kingdom.

Related content 

 Ruqun
 Qun
 Baidiequn

See also 
 Hanfu
 List of Hanfu
 Maweiqun - an underskirt introduced in Ming dynasty China from Joseon

Gallery

Notes

References

External links 

 Mamianqun worn by Princess Diana in 1981

Chinese traditional clothing